Hans Jakob Stampfer (1505/6– 2 July 1579) was a gold smith and medalist of Zürich in the age of Bullinger (antistes 1531–1575).
He was the son of gold smith Hans Ulrich Stampfer and of Regula Funk and learned the same trade both from his father and during journeyman years in Germany, likely Augsburg (Meyer 1871 mentions a strong influence by German medalist Friedrich Hagenauer, who was in Augsburg during 1526–1532). 
Stampfer returned to Zürich in 1531 (the year of the death of Zwingli). He is recorded as a member of the Kämbel guild in 1533, and as  the guild's representative in the city council in 1544. He acted as the city's assayer from 1539.
Zürich issued a thaler coin minted by Stampfer, the so-called Stampfertaler, during 1555–1560.
He married Margaretha von Schönau (d. 1555).
He was reeve of Wädenswil during 1570 to 1577.

At least 26 distinct medals by Stampfer are known, not including his production of coins for circulation, made during the period of 1531 to 1566. Most of his medals bear the monogram I·S.
His most famous works are  
the  Bundestaler (1546), with an early representation of the Three Confederates, and one of the earliest representations of the coats of arms of the Thirteen Cantons and of the Swiss cross, and the Patenpfennig for Princess Claude (1547).
He made various commemorative portrait medals, of Huldrych Zwingli (1531), of Nicholas of Flüe (c. 1540), among others, and medals with religious and allegorical themes such as the conversion of Paul, the Annunciation, Faith, Hope and Charity and Fortuna.

Jacob Stampfer was the first member of a "dynasty" of medalists that remained active in Zürich until the 1680s.
One Hans Ulrich Stampfer, possibly a brother of Jacob's, is recorded as active during 1561–1579.
Hans, possibly another brother, died in 1586.
Hans Ulrich Stampfer, son of Jacob (1562–1640) was active in the 1580s.
Hans Heinrich, a cousin of Hans Ulrich, died in 1610.
Another Hans Heinrich (1597–1655)   is recorded as reeve of Eglisau in 1652.
One Johannes Stampfer (1610–1687) signed a Zwölfer in 1654.
Another Johannes (1673–1692), son of one  Hans Ulrich, is the last of the dynasty.

References

Hans Lehmann, "Hans Jakob Stampfer: Ein Zürcher Medailleur und Goldschmied der Reformationszeit", Zwingliana II.8 (1908), 225–236.
Emil Hahn, Jakob Stampfer, Goldschmied, Medailleur und Stempelschneider von Zürich, 1505-1579 (1915).
Christian Winterstein, Die Basler Medaillen, Historisches Museum Basel (2012) [museum catalogue, includes five of Stampfer's medals].
Heinrich Meyer [1802–1871], "Jakob Stampfer, Medailleur des sechszehnten Jahrhunderts", Numismatische Zeitung (1871), 106–108.

External links

Commemorative medal made for Princess Claude of France (1547)

People from Zürich
1500s births
1579 deaths
Medallists